7 x Wilder is an album by jazz trombonist and arranger Bob Brookmeyer featuring compositions by Alec Wilder recorded in 1961 for the Verve label.

Reception

The Allmusic review by Ken Dryden stated "It shouldn't be surprising that Hall's softly speaking guitar is the perfect complement to Brookmeyer's almost vocal valve trombone, since the two meshed so well together while working in the Jimmy Giuffre Trio just a few years earlier". On All About Jazz, C. Andrew Hovan noted "7 x Wilder is Brookmeyer at his finest".

Track listing
All compositions by Alec Wilder except as indicated
 "While We're Young" (Alec Wilder, Morty Palitz, William Engvick) - 6:16
 "That's the Way It Goes" (Wilder, Sid Robin) - 4:43
 "The Wrong Blues" (Wilder, Engvick) - 4:38
 "It's So Peaceful in the Country" - 4:04
 "Blues for Alec" (Bob Brookmeyer) - 6:10
 "I'll Be Around" - 4:30
 "Who Can I Turn To" (Wilder, Engvick) - 4:27

Personnel 
 Bob Brookmeyer - valve trombone, piano
 Jim Hall - guitar
 Bill Crow - bass
 Mel Lewis - drums

References 

1961 albums
Verve Records albums
Bob Brookmeyer albums
Albums produced by Creed Taylor